is a Japanese sociologist and novelist.

Early life 
Furuichi was born in Tokyo in 1985. He graduated from the University of Tokyo Graduate School of Arts and Sciences.

Career
In his books, articles and TV appearances, Furuichi focuses on the circumstances of young people living in contemporary Japan. His most well-known book is The Happy Youth of a Desperate Country (Zetsubō no Kuni no Kōfuku na Wakamono-tachi; see short review and further links at ), a best-selling book released by Kodansha in 2011 where Furuichi makes the argument that, regardless of looming problems with the social security system and a host of other societal challenges, Japanese youth (those in their 20s) are now happier than ever before (for details, see ). This assertion contrasts with widespread assumptions, established in the 2000s, that young people in Japan are either 'slackers' with a low work morale, or the pitiful victims of partially de-regulated labour markets that have subjected young people to increasing uncertainty and low wages.

Furuichi is also a Ph.D. student at the Graduate School of Arts and Sciences of the University of Tokyo, a visiting scholar at Keio University's SFC research centre, as well as an executive at Zent, Ltd. Zent, Ltd. is a consulting firm at which Furuichi engages in marketing work and IT strategy planning. As of mid-2012, Furuichi is also investigating young Japanese entrepreneurs as well as the Japanese government's entrepreneurship policy. He is due to publish a new book in late 2012 on related issues.

Furuichi's other publications (in Japanese) include: The Hope Refugees: Peace Boat and the Illusion of Communities of Recognition (2010, Kobunsha: Tokyo) and The Era of Excursion-Type Consumption: Why Your Wife Wants to Shop at Costco (with Akiko Nakazawa; 2011, Asahi Shimbun Shuppansha: Tokyo).  A contributor to various literary magazines, Furuichi has recently critiqued the arbitrariness of institutionalized job-seeking practices that university students are expected to engage in, demonstrating the severe dilemmas of "most-popular employer" rankings (which seem to predict future company performance only very poorly; see Shincho 9/2012). He has also contributed accounts on new work-styles among Japanese youth, including that denoted by the category of "nomad workers" (nomado wākā). In June 2012, KOTOBA published a long dialogue between Furuichi and Tuukka Toivonen, an Oxford-based sociologist of youth and social innovation, which treated comparative elements of youth problems as well as the role that social entrepreneurs are playing in the restructuring Japanese society.

References

External links
 Pilling, David (2012) 'Youth of the ice age', Financial Times, July 6, 2012 External link.
 Furuichi, Noritoshi（古市憲寿）, Toivonen, Tuukka（トイボネン・トゥーッカ）, Terachi, Mikito（寺地幹人） and Ogawa, Tomu（小川豊武）(2012) 'Japanese Youth: An Interactive Dialogue: Towards Comparative Youth Research', The Asia-Pacific Journal, Vol 10, Issue 35, No. 3, August 27, 2012. See external open-access article
 Furuichi, Noritoshi. The Happy Youth of a Desperate Country: The Disconnect between Japan's Malaise and Its Millennials. Tokyo: Japan Publishing Industry Foundation for Culture, 2017. 

Japanese sociologists
1985 births
Living people
University of Tokyo alumni